is a title in Go. The association that holds this title is the Japanese Nihon Ki-in. It is sponsored by the Nikkei newspaper.

Outline
Recently, the format for the tournament was changed to a best of five. The challenger is decided in a tournament of 16 players, other than the title player. The winner's purse is ¥14 million ($173,000).

Past winners

See also 
 Ōza (shogi)

References

External links
 Nihon Ki-in archive (in Japanese)
 Ōza title games

 
Go competitions in Japan